Alston is an extinct town in Fairfield County, in the U.S. state of South Carolina. The GNIS classifies it as a populated place.

History
The community has the name of Joseph Alston, 44th Governor of South Carolina. A post office called Alston was established in 1850, and remained in operation until 1928.

See also
Spartanburg, Union and Columbia Railroad

References

Geography of Fairfield County, South Carolina
Ghost towns in South Carolina